Potato pancakes are shallow-fried pancakes of grated or ground potato, matzo meal or flour and a binding ingredient such as egg or applesauce, often flavored with grated garlic or onion and seasoning. They may be topped with a variety of condiments, ranging from the savory (such as sour cream or cottage cheese), to the sweet (such as apple sauce or sugar), or they may be served plain. The dish is sometimes made from mashed potatoes to make pancake-shaped croquettes. Some variations are made with sweet potatoes.

In different cultures

In Spain they are called tortillitas de patatas; in Mexico in some areas they are called tortas de patatas or camaron, and are only prepared in some regions for Lent or meatless Fridays.

It is the national dish of Belarus and Slovakia. In Germany, potato pancakes are eaten either salty (as a side dish) or sweet with apple sauce, or blueberries, sugar and cinnamon; they are a very common menu item during outdoor markets and festivals in colder seasons. In Swiss cuisine,  is a variation that never contains egg or flour. American hash browns are also without eggs and flour. Potato pancake is a traditional favorite in the southern parts of Indiana during holiday festivities.

There are four Swedish versions of potato pancakes.
  are prepared with a pancake batter of wheat flour, milk and egg, into which shredded raw potatoes are added. They are fried in butter and look like crêpes (i.e. thin pancakes).
  are also made of pancake batter and shredded potatoes, but the potatoes are cooked before they are shredded.
  are a variant more akin to hash browns and rösti, i.e. shredded raw potatoes formed as thin pancakes, but without any batter, which are fried in butter.
  are rather thick pancake-like patties of mashed potatoes and eggs, which are turned in breadcrumbs and then fried in butter. Can be bought ready-made in Sweden.

All four variants are traditionally served with fried bacon and lingonberry jam.

British potato cakes 
Potato cakes are common in the United Kingdom. In the North-East of England (particularly County Durham), there is a dish known as "tattie fish" because the pancake resembles a deep-fried piece of fish. The pancake consists of flour, eggs, shredded potatoes and onions. Some people add tomato or cheese to the mix.

The British also brought the potato pancake to former colonies such as Zimbabwe, where they are an affordable dish still eaten today.

Irish boxty
A form of potato pancake known as boxty is a popular traditional dish in most of Ireland, particularly north Connacht and southern Ulster. It is made similarly to the British type, with more starch and often with buttermilk and baking soda. It has a smooth, grained consistency.

Jewish latke  

Latkes (sometimes spelled latka) are potato pancakes that Ashkenazi Jews have prepared as part of the Hanukkah festival since the mid-1800s, when a series of crop failures in Poland and  Ukraine led to mass planting of potatoes, which were easy and cheap to grow. The potato dish is based on an older variant made with cheese instead of potatoes that goes back to at least the Middle Ages.

Latkes need not necessarily be made from potatoes. Prior to the introduction of the potato to the Old World, latkes were and in some places still are made from a variety of other vegetables, cheeses, legumes, or starches, depending on the available local ingredients and foods of the various places where Jews lived. Numerous modern recipes call for the addition of ingredients such as onions and carrots. Daily variations on a simple potato latka might include zucchini, sweet onion and gruyere (for French onion flavor) and some variations made with sweet potatoes.

The word , the Hebrew name for latke, refers in the Book of Samuel to a dumpling made from kneaded dough, as part of the story of Amnon and Tamar.
Some interpreters have noted that the homonym  means "heart", and the verbal form of l-v-v occurs in the Song of Songs as well. In the lexicon of Ashkenazi Jews from Udmurtia and Tatarstan there are recorded versions of the kosher-style appellation of latkes (draniki, dranki, krezliki, kremzliki, kakorki, etc.) during the eight-day Hanukkah holiday.

Korean gamja-jeon 

Gamja-jeon is a Korean pancake made by pan-frying in oil the mixture of grated potato and potato starch. It can be made without additional ingredients, but is sometimes mixed with onion, chilli and perilla leaf. Generally, it is seasoned with a small amount of salt and served with soy sauce.

Polish 

Placki ziemniaczane was a food staple at the 17th-century Polish monasteries according to written recipe from Stoczek Warmiński with one onion, two eggs and a spoonful of wheat flour per each kilogram of potatoes, served only with salt and pepper. In the 19th century, especially in times of economic difficulty during the foreign partitions, potato pancakes often replaced missing bread among the peasants. The lower-quality crops given to field laborers were sometimes turned by them quickly into pancakes to improve taste and prolong freshness. Also, their popularity is closely associated with the historic presence of one of the largest Jewish communities in the world flourishing in Poland.

The tongue-in-cheek games in Rzechta include the throwing of bad potato pancake, with the record of 29 meters.

Brigand's pancake 
A derived dish consists of thick goulash laid on a potato pancake. It has origins in or near Tatra mountains, on either Polish or Slovak side. The dish bears a variety of names:

 placek zbójnicki (brigand's) — most common
 placek cygański (gypsy's)
 placek węgierski (Hungarian) — despite being unknown in Hungary; but goulash (the topping) itself comes from Hungary
 jadło drwali (lumberjacks' food)
 placek góralski (mountainmen's)

Czech 

Some regional versions blend in dough, sauerkraut or sliced smoked meat. The same potato dough is used also as coating of fried pork chop called . It is sometimes deep fried.

Iranian 

In Iranian cuisine,  ('potato ') is made with shredded potatoes, eggs, onion, saffron, sometimes garlic chives and sometimes cinnamon. Frequently, potato kuku is cooked as smaller patties, but it is also cooked in a larger pancake-style or baked.

See also

 
 , a town in Ukraine that hosts an annual potato pancake festival

References

External links

 

Ashkenazi Jewish cuisine
Belarusian cuisine
Czech cuisine
Czech snack foods
German cuisine
Hanukkah foods
Latvian cuisine
Lithuanian cuisine
Polish cuisine
 
Russian cuisine
Slavic cuisine
Slovak cuisine
Ukrainian cuisine